"Everlasting Night" is a pop–dance song written by Australian singer Dannii Minogue, Mark Percy, Tim Lever, Ian Masterson and Terry Ronald for the compilation Gay & Lesbian Mardi Gras of 1999 (1999). It was released as a single in the first quarter of 1999 in Australia and reached number 42 on the singles chart, largely helped by the fact that the song was the official theme of the 1999 Sydney Gay and Lesbian Mardi Gras.

Originally written in 1995 while Minogue was working on material for a new album, she re-arranged it with long-time collaborators Ian Masterson and Terry Ronald after she had been approached by friends who were launching a new record label called Mardi Gras Music, the first gay and lesbian music label. Since its release, the song has become a favourite of Minogue's gay and lesbian fans and had become a live staple at British and Australian gay pride events.

The 1995 version was released on the 2009 album The 1995 Sessions.

Music video

"Everlasting Night" features a music video directed by Simon Smith, Gary Leeson and Minogue and was filmed in Sydney, Australia in 1999. The video, a tribute to Australia's gay and lesbian community, featured Minogue and a group of dancers performing in a club. It was heavily inspired by her performance the previous year at the Sydney Gay and Lesbian Mardi Gras and Minogue wanted it to convey the fun, party-like atmosphere she had experienced during her performance. The video was filmed in a Sydney nightclub called Home and featured many of Minogue's friends as dancers and party-goers.

The video begins with a drag queen stepping out of an elevator lip synching the first line of the song and then fades into fast-paced footage of a disco ball, people dancing at a party and street festivities during the Sydney Gay and Lesbian Mardi Gras. Scenes of the festivities are intercut with scenes of drag queens lip synching the song and Minogue dancing in a crowd of people.

Made available to music video channels in Australia prior to the single's commercial release.

Formats and track listings
These are the formats and track listings of major single releases of "Everlasting Night".

CD single
 "Everlasting Night" (Radio edit) – 4:11
 "Everlasting Night" (Extended mix) – 9:04
 "Everlasting Night" (Trouser Enthusiasts Burnt Angel mix) – 9:58

Chart positions 
Due to its strong support in the gay community and its reputation as a gay anthem "Everlasting Night" has charted in the mainstream chart for Australia and it often re-enters the dance charts on Mardi-Gras.

References

External links
"Everlasting Night" lyrics

1999 singles
Dannii Minogue songs
Songs written by Tim Lever
LGBT-related songs
Songs written by Ian Masterson
Song recordings produced by Ian Masterson
Songs written by Mike Percy (musician)
1998 songs